The season 1976–77 of the Tercera División (3rd tier) of the Spanish football started on August 1976 and ended on June 1977 with the relegation play-off finals.

League table

Group 1

Group 2

Group 3

Group 4

Relegation play-off

Relegation to Tercera (tier 4): Betis Dep.,Reus, Acero, Gran Peña
Promotion to Tercera (tier 4): Montijo, Turón, Porreras, Gijón Industrial
Relegation to Regional (tier 5): Laredo, Lagun Onak, Touring, Melilla

External links
RSSSF 
Futbolme 

Tercera División seasons
3
Spain